The 2022 Hastings Borough Council election took place on 5 May 2022 to elect members of Hastings Borough Council in the county of East Sussex, England. This was on the same day as other local elections. 16 of the 32 seats were up for election.

Background
Since its creation in 1973, Hastings has been under the control of all 3 major parties. The council was under no overall control until 1976, when the Conservatives won the council, before reverting to no overall control in 1980. The Liberal Democrats won the council briefly from 1996 to 1998, a period which also saw the Conservatives lose representation on the council. Labour controlled the council from 1998 to 2004. The Conservatives briefly held the council from 2006 to 2008, before Labour regained it in 2010. In the 2021 election, the Conservatives gained 4 with 40.7% of the vote, Labour lost 5 with 37.6%, and the Green Party gained their first seat on the council with 16.3%.

The seats up for election this year were last elected in 2018. In that election, no net gains or losses were made, and Labour achieved 48.6% of the vote, the Conservatives 31.3%, and the Green Party 10.8%.

Previous council composition 

Changes:
 December 2021: Claire Carr, councillor for the Castle ward, joins Green Party from Labour

Results

Results by ward
An asterisk (*) indicates an incumbent councillor.

Ashdown

Baird

Braybrooke

Castle

Central St Leonards

Conquest

Gensing

Hollington

Maze Hill

Old Hastings

Ore

Silverhill

St Helens

Tressell

West St Leonards

Wishing Tree

References

Hastings
Hastings Borough Council elections